Kiangyousteus is an extinct monotypic genus of dunkleosteid from the Middle Devonian: Givetian aged Guanwu Formation in the Sichuan province of south-western China. The type species, Kiangyousteus yohii, was the first known arthrodire from Asia.

Etymology
Kiangyousteus is named after Jiangyou (formerly ‘Kiangyou’) district of Sichuan Province, the location where the fossils were found in 1953 by Professor S. H. Yoh of Peking University.

Phylogeny
Kiangyousteus belongs to the family Dunkleosteidae. The phylogeny of Kiangyousteus can be shown in the cladogram below:

Alternatively, the subsequent 2016 Zhu et al. study using a larger morphological dataset recovered Panxiosteidae well outside of Dunkleosteoidea, leaving the status of Dunkleosteidae as a clade grouping separate from Dunkleosteoidea in doubt, as shown in the cladogram below:

References

Arthrodires
Placoderms of Asia